Iftikhar Ahmed Shah (1928 – 2020) was a Pakistani former swimmer. He competed in two events at the 1948 Summer Olympics.

References

External links
  

1928 births
2020 deaths
Pakistani male swimmers
Olympic swimmers of Pakistan
Swimmers at the 1948 Summer Olympics
Place of birth missing